The National Premier Leagues Western Australia is a regional Australian semi-professional soccer league comprising teams from Western Australia.  The league name is often abbreviated to NPL Western Australia or NPL WA. As a subdivision of the National Premier Leagues, the league is the highest level of the Western Australian league system (Level 2 of the overall Australian league system). The competition is administered by Football West, the governing body of the sport in the state. In 2014, the league – formerly known as the Football West State League Premier Division – was rebranded into what exists today.

History

NPL WA traces its origin to the formation of a league by the Perth British Football Association in 1896. By the 1950s, the association was known as the Western Australian Soccer Football Association (WASFA). In, 1960 eight teams formed their own association, the Soccer Federation of Western Australia (SFWA). The WASFA and SFWA ran rival leagues between 1960 and 1962 before the SFWA prevailed. Ahead of the 1991 season, 11 SFWA clubs broke away, forming the Soccer Administration of Western Australia (SAWA). The SAWA ran the rebel Professional Soccer League (PSL) in parallel with the SFWA first division until merging before the 1993 season to form the Professional Soccer Federation of Western Australia (PSF).

Several of the clubs currently playing in the league were formed as the soccer arm of cultural associations of recently migrated Australians, with certain teams having associations with particularly nationalities e.g. Swan Italian Club (now Swan United), Bayswater Inter (now Bayswater City) and Perth Italia (now Perth SC) with Italian Australians, Morley Windmills with Dutch Australians, Floreat Athena with Greek Australians, Benfica United (now Fremantle Spirit) with Portuguese Australians, Inglewood Kiev (now Inglewood United) with Ukrainian Australians, North Perth Croatia (now Western Knights) and Spearwood Dalmatinac (now part of Cockburn City) with Croatian Australians, Shamrock Rovers with Irish Australians, Dianella White Eagles with Serbian Australians and Stirling Macedonia with Macedonian Australians. In 1994 clubs were forced by the sport's governing body to remove all references to ethnicities from their names, which resulted in several forced name changes. Some clubs reverted back to their former names after 2019, when the National Club Identity Policy was revoked. More recently, new clubs have begun to be based geographically, such as with Armadale SC and Cockburn City.

The West Australian National Training Centre included a team for the 2011–2013 seasons. They did not play for competition points, and were mostly used for development of the upcoming youth players.

Format
In 2013 Football Federation of Australia introduced the new second tier competition for football in Australia, the National Premier Leagues. In 2014 Football West then reorganised the former State Premier League into the National Premier Leagues Western Australia conference and the State League (Division One and Division Two). The NPL WA competition fields a Senior first team, as well as youth teams from U12 to U20 age groups. The Perth Glory FC Youth team competes in the Senior category and has additional age restrictions.

Promotion and relegation between the NPL and the State League Division 1 became possible for the first time at the end of the 2015 season, provided the winner of the State Division 1 met Football West's promotion requirements. Two teams were promoted after the 2016 season to expand the league into a 14 team competition. After a further competition review the 2019 NPLWA season returned to a twelve-team competition. In 2020, promotion and relegation was suspended for the season, due to the impacts on the competition from the COVID-19 pandemic in Australia.

Clubs
The following 12 clubs are competing in the 2023 NPL WA season.

Honours

Notes
 U undefeated league season.

Honours pre-NPL (1896–2013)

Notes
 U undefeated league season

References :

See also
 National Premier Leagues WA Women

Notes

References

External links
 Football West website

National Premier Leagues
1
Recurring sporting events established in 1896
1896 establishments in Australia
Sports leagues established in 1896